The Snow Bride is a 1923 American silent drama film directed by Henry Kolker, written by Julie Herne and Sonya Levien, and starring Alice Brady, Maurice 'Lefty' Flynn, Mario Majeroni, Nick Thompson, Jack Baston, and Stephen Grattan. It was released on April 29, 1923, by Paramount Pictures. It is not known whether the film currently survives.

Cast
Alice Brady as Annette Leroux
Maurice 'Lefty' Flynn as André Porel 
Mario Majeroni as Gaston Laroux
Nick Thompson as Indian Charlie
Jack Baston as Paul Gerard
Stephen Grattan as Padre
William Cavanaugh as Pierre
Margaret Morgan as Leonia

References

External links

1923 films
1920s English-language films
Silent American drama films
1923 drama films
Paramount Pictures films
Films directed by Henry Kolker
Films with screenplays by Sonya Levien
American black-and-white films
American silent feature films
1920s American films